The Gasparilla Pirate Festival (often simply referred to as "Gasparilla") is a large parade and a host of related community events held in Tampa, Florida almost every year since 1904. The centerpiece of the festivities is the Parade of Pirates (often referred to as the Gasparilla Parade), which is a friendly invasion by the mythical pirate José Gaspar (also known as Gasparilla), who is a popular figure in Florida folklore despite the fact that he did not exist.

The parade is organized by Ye Mystic Krewe of Gasparilla (YMKG), a local organization modeled after the "krewes" of Mardi Gras in New Orleans who play the parts of Gaspar and his crew. On Gasparilla Day, members of YMKG don pirate regalia and sail across Tampa Bay aboard the Jose Gasparilla II, a  "pirate ship" which is actually a steel barge converted to look like a large West Indiaman. Firing loud mini-canons and accompanied by hundreds of private boats, the pirates make their way to the Tampa Convention Center, where they demand that the mayor surrender the key to the city in a playful ceremony. Gaspar and his crew then stage a "victory parade" featuring 50 additional krewes, over 100 floats, and dozens of other community organizations along a route traveling  down Bayshore Boulevard, throwing beads and other trinkets to a crowd of about 300,000. The parade has always been held along Tampa's waterfront near downtown Tampa, and since 2011, it has ended along the Tampa Riverwalk, where festivities continue into the nighttime hours.

Gasparilla began as a surprise "pirate invasion" on horseback during the city's May Day festival in 1904. Over the next decade, the pirate parade was staged as an occasional add-on to other community events, with the highlight of the early period being the first seaborne invasion in 1911. The "Gasparilla Festival" became a stand-alone event in 1913, and with exception of hiatuses during the world wars and on two other occasions, it has been celebrated every year since. Scheduling varied from May to February before World War 2, after which the parade was usually held on a Monday in late January or early February. Since 2005, the Parade of Pirates has taken place on the last Saturday in January.

Over time, the formerly one-day event evolved into a "Gasparilla season" which runs approximately from the beginning of the year until mid-March. Two other major parades during this time are the Gasparilla Children's Parade, which is held on Bayshore Boulevard one week before the main parade, and the Sant'Yago Illuminated Knight Parade, which is organized by the Krewe of the Knights of Sant'Yago in the historic neighborhood of Ybor City two weeks after the main parade. Besides the three large parades, the city hosts many other community events during this time, including the Gasparilla Film Festival, the Gasparilla Festival of the Arts, the Gasparilla Distance Classic, the Gasparilla Music Festival, the Gasparilla Bowl college football game, and a lineup of many other events that varies from year to year.

The Gasparilla Pirate Festival has been popular in Tampa since its inception and has grown into the third largest parade in the United States. Taken together, the events of Tampa's Gasparilla Season have an estimated local economic impact of about $40 million.

Description

Parade of Pirates 

The theme and focal point of Gasparilla is a friendly "invasion" by mythical pirate José Gaspar and his crew, who are portrayed by members of Ye Mystic Krewe of Gasparilla (YMKG), an organization created for this purpose in 1904. Around noon on the Gasparilla Day, members of YMKG set sail across Tampa Bay from near Ballast Point Park to downtown aboard the Jose Gasparilla, a 165' long flat-bottomed steel barge which was specially built and decorated for this purpose in 1954. The "pirate ship" fires a near-continuous barrage of loud mini-canons during its journey between Davis Island and Harbour Island accompanied by hundreds of smaller private boats. It moors along the Riverwalk behind the Tampa Convention Center, where the "pirate captain" demands that the mayor hand over the key to the city in a playful ceremony which has had different outcomes in different years. Whether or not the mayor actually "surrenders", the pirates stage a "victory parade" along Bayshore Boulevard. 

During the parade, members of Ye Mystic Krewe of Gasparilla along with dozens of other krewes throw beads, coins, and various souvenirs to the throngs from about 100 floats, most of them pirate-themed. In addition to the krewes, high school and university marching bands and drill teams often participate, and many local businesses and organizations build and enter their own elaborate floats from which they also throw trinkets to the crowd. The parade has been broadcast live on local television for decades: WFLA-TV has provided coverage since 1955, and WTVT-TV also covered the parade from 1955 to 1980.

Krewes 
Many of the events of Tampa's Gasparilla season are organized by "krewes", which are social and charitable organizations modeled on the krewes that participate in the Mardi Gras festivities of New Orleans. "Ye Mystic Krewe of Gasparilla" (YMKG) came together informally to stage the first pirate "invasion" in 1904 and has evolved into a registered non-profit organization which has organized the Gasparilla Parade ever since. As the planning has become more complicated over the years, however, the parade has accepted corporate sponsorships to defray costs and hired EventFest to coordinate the event with the city. Besides planning Gasparilla and its own private events, YMKG raises money for various charitable causes and annually endows several college scholarships through its community fund.

The Krewe of Gasparilla was Tampa's only Gasparilla krewe until the woman-only Krewe of Venus was organized in 1966, the Ybor City-based Krewe of the Knights of Sant'Yago was organized in 1972, the Tampa Rough Riders were organized in 1978, and many more were established after YMKG opened up participation in the parade to more krewes in the 1990s. Krewes are centered around various ethnic, cultural, and historical themes or favorite charity causes, and much like the krewes of Mardi Gras, members often spend a great deal of money on elaborate costumes, beads, and floats.

Currently, over fifty krewes march in the Gasparilla Parade of Pirates, with smaller krewes participating on a rotating basis due to the limited number of available slots. Many of the same krewes - large and small - also participate in the Gasparilla Children's Parade and the Sant'Yago Knight Parade.

Throws 
Parade participants on floats and on foot have traditionally tossed souvenirs as they make their way along the route, but the specific items have changed over time. Plastic beads like those at New Orleans Mardi Gras festivities are by far the most prevalent item, with varieties ranging from simple single-color necklaces to intricate and expensive designs, most of which are purchased by krewe members themselves. So many beads are thrown that in recent years, the city has organized post-parade volunteer cleanup efforts which annually collect thousands of pounds of plastic from the parade route and nearby Tampa Bay.

Though very popular now, beads were rarely seen at Gasparilla Parades before the 1990s. The two most common throws before that were plastic or metal commemorative coins produced annually by various krewes and spent gun cartridges. For decades, many members of YMKG walked the parade route armed with six-shooters or other handguns loaded with blanks which they frequently fired in the air. The empty shells were tossed aside as the pirate reloaded, sending children scrambling for the unique souvenirs. This tradition was restricted in the interest of safety in 1992 and ended entirely several years later. However, while pirates on foot are no longer allowed to use firearms during the parade, trained members of YMKG still fire loud mini-canons from several specialized floats and during the cross-bay voyage of the Jose Gasparilla II.

Prelude and departure 
Several semi-theatrical events around Gaspar's "pirate invasion" have become traditional:
About two weeks before the Parade of Pirates, a US Navy ship volunteers to be "attacked" by small boats of the "Ybor City Navy" armed with stale Cuban bread and water hoses. The US Navy returns "fire" with their own water hoses but eventually surrenders to the Alcalde of Ybor City, who, as the story goes, has been hired by Jose Gaspar to clear resistance to his impending pirate attack. After the "battle", the navy sailors are treated to an evening on the town. This event began in 1956, and while it was temporarily discontinued after the September 11, 2001 attacks, it has been held most years since, with the museum ship SS American Victory usually standing in for the US Navy.
A few days before the Parade of Pirates, members of Ye Mystic Krewe of Gasparilla in full pirate regalia "kidnap" the mayor of Tampa at city hall, take them to a downtown park before assembled local media and onlookers, and demand that the city surrender to Jose Gaspar or suffer the consequences. The mayor playfully refuses, and the pirates declare that Gaspar will arrive with an "invasion force" on the following Saturday to steal the key to the city. 
The Outward Voyage Home is the culminating event of the Gasparilla season which was revived in 2008 after being discontinued in 1964. During this ceremony, the Ye Mystic Krewe of Gasparilla's pirates return the key of the city to the mayor, then climb aboard the Jose Gasparilla and "sail away" across Tampa Bay while festivities continue along the Tampa Riverwalk. The Outward Voyage usually takes place on the first Saturday in March.

Children's Parade 

The Children's Gasparilla Extravaganza is held on the Saturday prior to the main parade, currently the second-to-last Saturday in January. It is billed as a "family friendly" event, as unlike during the Parade of Pirates, alcohol is not allowed along the parade route, which runs along Bayshore Boulevard and is about half as long as the main Gasparilla Parade. The Children's Parade was first held in 1947 and has grown over the years, usually drawing about 100,000 attendees.

The Children's Parade features some of the same krewes and floats as the main parade. However, many children of krewe members don costumes to ride aboard floats and toss beads and trinkets to the crowd, and various youth organizations such as sports and dance teams also participate. Various activities and events for children are held in and around downtown Tampa in the hours before the Children's Parade, including the Preschooler's Stroll, which is a short, informal parade of small children riding pirate-themed wagons, strollers, bicycles, and scooters that runs for a few blocks along Bayshore Boulevard. To add noise to the festivities, the pirate ship Jose Gasparilla usually sails nearby firing its mini-cannons during the parade, and the day ends with a fireworks display over Tampa Bay.

Sant'Yago Illuminated Knight Parade 

The Sant'Yago Illuminated Knight Parade (sometimes referred to as the "Gasparilla Night Parade") has been organized since 1972 by the Krewe of the Knights of Sant'Yago. It is held in the historical neighborhood of Ybor City on a Saturday night, usually two weeks after the Parade of Pirates in mid-February. The Knight Parade features a similar mix of participants as the Parade of Pirates, with most of the floats are brightly illuminated since the event begins after dark. Though it once had the reputation of being the most "adult-oriented" parade of Tampa's Gasparilla season, the city has tried to reduce public drunkenness and other unruly behavior in recent years and has promoted the parade as a family-friendly event, with some success.

Additional events of Gasparilla Season 
Besides the three main parades and the many galas, parties, and fundraisers hosted by individual krewes, Tampa has long hosted a variety of other Gasparilla-related events from approximately January through March. One of the first was the Gasparilla Open, a PGA Tour stop which was sponsored by Ye Mystic Krewe of Gasparilla (YMKG) from 1932 to 1935. The 1935 edition had the largest prize purse on that year's PGA Tour ($4000), but with the deepening of the Great Depression, the tournament was discontinued thereafter. It returned in 1956 as the Gasparilla Invitational Tournament, an amateur competition which has been held annually ever since.

Other large-scale events held during the Gasparilla season include the Gasparilla Festival of the Arts (established 1970), the Tampa Rough Rider's St. Patrick's Day Parade (first held in 1977), the Gasparilla Distance Classic road race (established 1978), the Gasparilla Film Festival (established 2006), the Gasparilla Music Festival (established 2013), and the Gasparilla Bowl college football game (renamed in 2018).

Use of the name "Gasparilla" 

A wide variety of local businesses, organzations, and smaller events ranging from restaurants to beauty pageants to classic car shows and food festivals also use the names "Gaspar" or "Gasparilla"; according to the Florida Department of State, over 100 entities have registered related names.  Other local organizations have taken on the Gasparilla / pirate theme, most prominently the National Football League's Tampa Bay Buccaneers, who first took the field in 1976 and installed a replica pirate ship in the stands of their home field at Raymond James Stadium.

Most of the organizations, events, and businesses who use "Gaspar" or "Gasparilla" are not affiliated with Ye Mystic Krewe of Gasparilla or the City of Tampa, neither of which owns the monikers. While some feel that the widespread use of the name constitutes a "co-branding" which promotes all similarly named organizations and Tampa in general, others believe that overuse could "water down what it means", and that the potential failures or missteps of one event or organization might reflect poorly on all the others. In 2019, YMKG began an effort to legally to trademark the name Gasparilla to "protect" it for use by "appropriate community events", drawing complaints and counterclaims from others who have used the name or own the trademark for other, more narrow uses. As of the 2020 edition of the Gasparilla Pirate Fest, the issue was being considered by the United States Trademark Trial and Appeal Board.

Economic impact 
Crowd size for the Parade of Pirates is typically about 300,000, making it the third largest parade in the United States, and an estimated 1,000,000 people attend at least one Gasparilla event in a given year. According to several studies, the Parade of Pirates alone has a local economic impact of over $20 million, and the combined events bring in over $40 million. To tie these events together in the public eye, Visit Tampa Bay, the local tourist bureau, has run multimillion-dollar promotional campaigns across the United States, Canada, and Europe to attract visitors to the area during "Gasparilla Season".

Inspiration 

The theme of the Gasparilla Festival was inspired by the legend of the pirate José Gaspar, who supposedly operated off the west coast of Spanish Florida from the 1780s until the 1820s. Different versions of the story say that he was either a Spanish nobleman and advisor to King Charles III of Spain who was exiled after a romantic scandal in court, a traitorous admiral of the Spanish Royal Navy who stole a ship and fled when his treachery was revealed, or an ambitious young officer in the Spanish navy who was driven to mutiny by a tyrannically cruel captain. Whatever his supposed origins, the legends agree that Gaspar fled to the virtually uninhabited southwestern coast of Spanish Florida in the 1780s and established his "pirate kingdom" on Gasparilla Island in Charlotte Harbor, south of Tampa Bay. Gaspar is said to have taken many ships and held many female hostages for ransom while preying on shipping in the Gulf of Mexico from Louisiana to the Spanish main aboard his flagship, the Floriblanca. His exploits came to a sudden end in 1821 when, to avoid being captured by the U.S. Navy pirate hunting schooner USS Enterprise, he wrapped himself in anchor chains and threw himself overboard while shouting ""Gasparilla dies by his own hand, not the enemy's!"

Despite this colorful history, there is no evidence that a pirate named "Gaspar" or "Gasparilla" ever roamed the Florida coast. Archives in Spain make no mention of Gaspar as a member of the Spanish court or an officer in the Spanish navy, the U.S. Navy has no documentation indicating that any of its vessels ever encountered a pirate named Gaspar or a ship named Floriblanca, and neither Gaspar nor anyone claiming to be a member of his crew are mentioned in the records of hundreds of piracy trials from the era, which was well after the "Golden Age of Piracy". Also, despite the fact that the supposed location of Gaspar's "regal base" at Gasparilla Island has been developed into the resort town of Boca Grande, no artifacts or other physical evidence of the hideout, his ship, or his lost treasure has ever been found in southwest Florida despite years of searching by amateur and professional treasure-seekers.

The first written account of José Gaspar appeared in the early 1900s as part of an advertising brochure for the Gasparilla Inn in Boca Grande on Gasparilla Island. The brochure was produced and widely distributed by the Charlotte Harbor and Northern Railway, which built the resort at the end of its rail line. Besides promotional material and contact information for the Gasparilla Inn, the brochure prominently featured the "Story of Jose Gasparilla," the "last of the Buccaneers" who it said had terrorized the Gulf of Mexico for almost 40 years. The fantastical biography was penned by publicist Pat Lemoyne, who combined and embellished tall tales attributed to well-known and recently deceased local fishing guide "Panther John" Gomez to create the legend of the pirate Gaspar, which Lemoyne freely admitted was "without a true fact in it." Among its many inaccuracies, the brochure stated that pirate's nickname "Gasparilla" means "Gaspar the outlaw" in Spanish when it is actually a form meaning "little Gaspar", that Gasparilla Island was named for the pirate when the name actually appears on Spanish and English maps from well before his supposed arrival, and that the "bleached bones" of Gaspar's victims along with many old coins had been discovered in local "Indian mounds" when no such find has ever been documented. The brochure also claimed that the bulk of Gaspar's vast treasure cache "still lies unmoved" somewhere in the vicinity of Boca Grande.

In 1923, author Francis Bradlee obtained a copy of the Gasparilla Inn brochure and, assuming it was factual, included Gaspar in a book he was writing about piracy in the West Indies. This error led to Gaspar being mentioned in a few other non-fiction books about piracy and Florida history, causing ongoing confusion as to the authenticity of the legend. However, though many versions of José Gaspar's adventures have been told in various forms over the years - including pulp adventure novels, tourist guides, and official histories of Ye Mystic Krewe of Gasparilla - all have their basis in the fictional tale first printed in an advertisement for the Gasparilla Inn.

History

Origins 

The first Gasparilla parade was held in May 1904, after Tampa Tribune society editor Louise Frances Dodge and Tampa's director of customs George Hardee decided to combine elements of New Orleans Mardi Gras with a pirate theme to promote and enliven Tampa's May Day celebration. The first occurrence consisted of several dozen local businessmen disguising themselves as pirates, riding horses through town to simulate a surprise pirate invasion, and encouraging startled observers to follow them to the May Day festival. The second Gasparilla the following year was not a surprise, as every automobile owner in town was invited to join the mounted pirates in the parade. The pirate festival took a brief hiatus from 1906 until 1910, when it was revived as part of a community celebration marking the opening of the Panama Canal. In 1913, "Gasparilla Carnival" was organized as an independent event, as it has remained ever since.

Location and dates

Parade route 
At least a portion of the Gasparilla Parade of Pirates has traversed Bayshore Boulevard into downtown almost since its inception. For several decades, the parade route ended at Plant Field, where the Florida State Fair was taking place, drawing more attendees to the simultaneous events. Since 2011, the parade route has ended at Curtis Hixon Waterfront Park along the Tampa Riverwalk, where festivities continue into the evening.

Schedule 
The main Gasparilla parade was held in conjunction with various other events in its early years, so its timing varied, and it sometimes was not held at all. The first "pirate invasion" was held on May 4, 1904, and the dates of Gasparilla ranged from February to May over the next few occurrences. After a hiatus during World War I, the Gasparilla parade was held in mid-February. In the decades after another hiatus during World War II, it was set for the second Monday in February. Gasparilla became an official holiday in Tampa during this time, with local schools and government offices closed for the day. In 1988, the Parade of Pirates was moved to the first Saturday in February to make it easier for residents of other communities to take part in the festivities. Since 2005, it has been held on the last Saturday in January.

As the scheduling of the Parade of Pirates has shifted over the years, the dates of the other two large parades of the season have generally shifted as well, with the Children's Parade held one week before and the Krewe of San'Yago Illuminated Knight Parade held two weeks after the main Gasparilla Parade.

Exceptions 
The Parade of Pirates has been held every year since 1947 with two exceptions: in 1991, when a controversy over inclusion saw Ye Mystic Krewe of Gasparilla refuse to participate, and in 2021, when the parades and most related events were canceled due to the COVID-19 pandemic.
 
In 2001, the Parade of Pirates was held a week earlier than usual to coincide with Super Bowl XXXV, which was played in Tampa the next day. "Supersized Gasparilla" saw a record attendance of about 750,000, but though the event was generally well received, the city has opted not to reschedule the parade to coincide with subsequent Superbowls played in Tampa due to the serious challenges posed by large crowds and snarled traffic. However, in 2018, the city did not change the regularly scheduled date of the parade to avoid the NHL All-Star Game and related activities, which were held at Amalie Arena in downtown Tampa over the same weekend.

Pirate ship 

The first shipborne Gasparilla invasion came in 1911, when a merchant vessel was borrowed, decorated, and temporarily rechristened the Jose Gaspar for the day. Borrowed ships were used until the 1930s, when Ye Mystic Krewe of Gasparilla bought an old merchant sloop and repurposed it as the Jose Gasparilla, which they use for about twenty years.

The old wooden ship was in serious need of repairs and renovation by the early 1950s, so with financial assistance from the city of Tampa, YMKG commissioned the $100,000 Jose Gasparilla II, which was constructed from a  steel barge to which masts and other elements were added so that it resembles an 18th-century West Indiaman. The sails are merely decorative and the "pirate ship" has no engine, so on Gasparilla Day, it is guided through the flotilla of accompanying smaller vessels by three tugboats helmed by experienced harbor pilots. The current ship has crossed Tampa Bay to lead every Gasparilla invasion since its launching in 1954 except for 1971, when bad weather and rough seas cancelled the flotilla, though not the parade.

For over half a century, various Gasparilla pirate ships would sail about half a mile up the Hillsborough River to near the University of Tampa, where members of YMKG would disembark for the parade. However, the construction of the Lee Roy Selmon Expressway through downtown in 1976 ended that tradition, as the  masts of the Jose Gasparilla II do not fit under the expressway where it bridges the river near its mouth. Since then, the ship has sailed into the Garrison Channel on the southern side of downtown, and since the 1990s, it has docked along the Tampa Riverwalk behind the Tampa Convention Center, where the pirates are greeted by thousands of revelers before the parade. Outside of Gasparilla season, the Jose Gasparilla II can usually be found moored near the northern end of Bayshore Boulevard within sight of downtown.

Inclusion / Super Bowl controversy 
The membership of Ye Mystic Krewe of Gasparilla is overwhelmingly made up of Tampa's business and civic leaders, which meant that for many decades, the organization was exclusively white and male, leading to some resentment from unrepresented groups. The Krewe of Venus (a women's organization formed by relatives of YMKG members) was allowed to join the parade in 1966, and the Krewe of Sant'Yago (formed by leading members of Tampa's Latin community) began holding their own Gaspar-themed parade in Ybor City in 1972, with both krewes collaborating somewhat with YMKG. However, African-Americans and others among Tampa's diverse population felt left out of the planning and organization of the events, with some observers questioning the tradition of local elites dressing as pirates and pretending to plunder the city.

The issue grew into a heated controversy in 1990, when the city planned to stage the Parade of Pirates a week earlier than usual to coincide with Super Bowl XXV, which was to be played at Tampa Stadium in January 1991. The city and the National Football League put pressure on the Krewe of Gasparilla to admit African-American members before the event, but the organization refused and cancelled Gasparilla instead. The city of Tampa hastily put together a replacement parade called "Bamboleo", which was billed as a "multicultural festival" and did not include pirates. Rainy weather helped to dampen the crowds, and the replacement was considered a "flop". Later in 1991, the Krewe of Gasparilla agreed to accept black members and allow more krewes to participate in the parade, and Gasparilla returned for 1992.

When Tampa next hosted a Super Bowl in 2001, the parade was held on the Saturday before the game, and an integrated Krewe of Gasparilla was joined by over 30 other diverse krewes before a record crowd of 750,000. The number of krewes and similar civic organizations has continued to grow in recent years, dampening controversies over inclusion. However, due to practical concerns, participation in the Parade of Pirates has been limited to fifty krewes per year, with smaller krewes taking turns on a rotating basis.

References

External links
Gasparilla Pirate Festival - Official Site
Ye Mystic Krewe of Gasparilla Records at the University of South Florida

Festivals in Tampa, Florida
Parades in the United States
History of Tampa, Florida
1904 establishments in Florida
Recurring events established in 1904
Annual events in Florida